The Bete were the traditional priestly class in Fiji. The kalou-vu (Ancestor-Gods) were believed to speak through the Bete.

See also
 Bété

Footnotes

Religion in Fiji